Louis de Boissy (26 November 1694, Vic-sur-Cère – 19 April 1758, Paris) was an 18th-century French poet and playwright.  He was elected to seat 6 of the Académie française on 12 August 1754.  He wrote satires and several comedies, of which the best is Les Dehors trompeurs ou l'Homme du jour (The False Appearances, or the Man of the Moment), the great success of the 1740 season, with a cast including Quinault-Dufresne and Jeanne Quinault. Boissy had the concession to print the Mercure de France.  His son was Louis Michel de Boissy. The historian Louis Michel de Boissy was his son.

Works 
His works were published in 9 volumes in-8 in Paris in 1766.
Theatre
1721: L'Amant de sa femme, ou la Rivale d'elle-même, one-act comedy in prose, Théâtre-Français, 19 September Text online
1724: L'Impatient, five-act comedy in verse, preceded by a prologue, Théâtre-Français, 26 January
1725: Le Babillard, one-act comedy in verse Théâtre-Français, 16 June Text online
1727: Admète et Alceste, five-act tragedy, Théâtre-Français, 25 January
1727: Le Français à Londres, one-act comedy in prose, Théâtre-Français, 19 July Text online
1727: La Mort d'Alceste, five-act tragedy in verse, Théâtre-Français, 26 November
1728: Don Ramire et Zaïde, five-act tragedy in verse, Théâtre-Français, 24 January
1729: L'Impertinent malgré lui, ou les Amants mal assortis, five-act comedy in verse, Théâtre-Français, 14 May
1729: Melpomène vengée, ou les Trois Spectacles réduits à un et les Amours des déesses à rien, one-act comedy in prose, Théâtre-Français, 3 September
1730: Le Triomphe de l'intérêt, one-act comedy in verse with a divertissement and two comédies en vaudevilles, Comédie Italienne, 8 November
1731: Momus exilé, ou le Je ne sais quoi, one-act comedy in free verse, Comédie Italienne, 10 September Text online
1732: La Critique, one-act comedy in free verse, Comédie Italienne, 9 February
1732: La Vie est un songe, three-act comédie héroïque in verse, Comédie Italienne, 12 November
1732: L'Auteur superstitieux, à-propos in 1 act, Comédie Italienne, 9 February Text online
1733: Les Étrennes, ou la Bagatelle, one-act comedy in verse, Comédie Italienne, January
1733: Le Badinage, ou le Dernier Jour de l'absence, one-act comedy in verse, Théâtre-Français, 23 November
1734: La Surprise de la haine, three-act comedy in verse, Comédie Italienne, 10 February
1734: L'Apologie du siècle, ou Momus corrigé, one-act comedy in free verse, Comédie Italienne, 1 April
1734: Les Billets doux, comédie divertissement in verse, Comédie Italienne, 15 September
1735: Les Amours anonymes, three-act comedy in verse, Comedie Italienne, 5 December 
1736: Le Comte de Neuilly, comédie héroïque in 5 acts and in verse, Comédie Italienne, 18 January
1737: Les Deux Nièces, ou la Confidente d'elle-même, five-act comedy in verse, Théâtre-Français, 17 January
1737: La ****, three-act comedy in verse, Comédie Italienne, 17 August 1737
1738: Le Pouvoir de la sympathie, three-act comedy in verse, Théâtre-Français, 5 July
1739: Le Rival favorable, three-act comedy in verse, Comédie Italienne, 30 January
1739: Les Talents à la mode, three-act comedy in verse, Comédie Italienne, 17 September
1740: Dehors les trompeurs, ou l'Homme du jour, five-act comedy in verse, Théâtre-Français, 18 February Text online
1741: L'Embarras du choix, five-act comedy in verse, Paris, Théâtre-Français, 11 December Text online
1742: Le Mari garçon, three-act comedy in verse, Comédie Italienne, 10 February 1742
1743: Paméla en France, ou la Vertu mieux éprouvée, three-act comedy in verse, Comédie Italienne, 4 March 
1743: La Fête d'Auteuil ou la Fausse Méprise, three-act comedy in verse, Théâtre-Français, August
1744: L'Époux par supercherie (The Husband by Trickery), two-act comedy, Théâtre-Français, 8 March  Text online
1745: La Folie du jour, one-act comedy in verse, Théâtre-Français, 5 July
1745: Le Sage Etourdi, three-act comedy in verse, Théâtre-Français, 5 July Text online
1745: Le Médecin par occasion, five-act comedy in verse, Théâtre-Français, 12 March Text online
1745: Le Plagiaire, three-act comedy in verse, Comédie Italienne, 1 February 
1746: Le Duc de Surrey, five-act pièce héroïque in verse, Théâtre-Français, 18 May
1748: Les Valets maîtres, comédie en vers libres et en 2 actes, Comédie Italienne, 20 February
1748: La Péruvienne, five-act comedy in free verse, Théâtre-Français, 5 June
1749: Le Retour de la paix, one-act comedy in verse, Comédie Italienne, 22 February Text online
1749: La Comète, one-act comedy in free vere, Théâtre-Français, 11 June
1751: Le Prix du silence, three-act comedy in verse, Théâtre italien de Paris, 26 February
1753: La Frivolité, one-act comedy in verse, Comédie Italienne, 23 January
1753: Programme d'Eugénie, ou des Effets de l'amour, three-act comedy, with 3 intermeds, Château de Fontainebleau, 15 November
1753: Le Maire de village, opera in prose, Théâtre de l'Ambigu-Comique, 6 February
Varia
1718: L'Élève de Terpsichore, ou le Nourrisson de la satire
1751: Les Filles femmes et les femmes filles, ou le Monde changé, conte qui n'en est pas un. Les Quinze minutes ou le Temps bien employé, conte d'un quart d'heure

References

Sources 
 Jean le Rond D'Alembert, « Éloge de Boissy » in Œuvres complètes de d'Alembert, Paris, Belin et Bossange, t. 3, 1re partie, 1821,

External links 
 Louis de Boissy on data.bnf.fr
 Académie française site - biography

1694 births
1758 deaths
People from Auvergne
French satirists
18th-century French dramatists and playwrights
18th-century French poets
18th-century French male writers